Qingshui is a railway station on the Taiwan Railways Administration West Coast line (Coastal line) located in Qingshui District, Taichung, Taiwan.

History
The station, called , was opened on 15 December 1920.

Around the station
 National Qingshui Senior High School
 Niumatou Site
 Wuqi Fishing Port
 Taichung City Seaport Art Center

See also
 List of railway stations in Taiwan

References

1920 establishments in Taiwan
Railway stations in Taichung
Railway stations opened in 1920
Railway stations served by Taiwan Railways Administration